A Wright Christmas is the first Christmas album by the Canadian country music singer-songwriter Michelle Wright. It was released on October 25, 2005, on Icon Records.

Track listing
 Have Yourself a Merry Little Christmas (Ralph Blane, Hugh Martin) – 4:21
 Jingle Bell Rock (Joe Beal, Jim Boothe) – 2:10
 Joy to the World (George Handel, Isaac Watts) – 4:08
 I Know Santa's Been Here (Patricia Conroy) – 2:00
 Little Drummer Boy (Katherine Davis, Henry Onorati, Harry Simeone) – 3:35
 Rudolph the Red-Nosed Reindeer (Johnny Marks) – 3:22
 The Christmas Song (Mel Tormé, Robert Wells) – 3:42
 Silent Night (Franz Gruber, Joseph Mohr) – 4:12
 Go Tell It on the Mountain (Traditional) – 2:52
 Winter Wonderland (Felix Bernard, Richard Smith) – 3:38
 O Come All Ye Faithful (Frederick Oakeley, John Francis Wade) – 3:24
 White Christmas (Irving Berlin) – 3:22

References

Michelle Wright albums
2005 Christmas albums
Christmas albums by Canadian artists
Country Christmas albums